Bull Run National Forest was established as the Bull Run Forest Reserve by the General Land Office in Oregon on June 17, 1892, with .  After the transfer of federal forests to the U.S. Forest Service in 1905, it became a National Forest on March 4, 1907. On July 1, 1908, the entire forest was combined with part of Cascade National Forest to establish Oregon National Forest and the name was discontinued.  The lands are now part of Mount Hood National Forest.

See also 
 Bull Run River (Oregon)
 Bull Run Watershed
 Adolph Aschoff

References

External links
Forest History Society
Listing of the National Forests of the United States and Their Dates (Forest History Society website) Text from Davis, Richard C., ed. Encyclopedia of American Forest and Conservation History. New York: Macmillan Publishing Company for the Forest History Society, 1983. Vol. II, pp. 743-788.

Former National Forests of Oregon
1892 establishments in Oregon
Protected areas established in 1892
1908 disestablishments in Oregon